Sergio Abad Beyxer (born 1 March 1989), commonly known as Mono, is a Spanish footballer who plays for UD Petrelense CF as a central midfielder or winger.

Club career
Mono was born in Valencia, and finished his graduation with Levante UD's youth setup. He made his senior debuts with the reserves in the 2007–08 campaign, in Segunda División B.

Mono made his first team – and La Liga – debut on 21 November 2010, coming on as a second-half substitute for Felipe Caicedo in a 3–1 home win against Racing de Santander. He would spend the rest of his spell exclusively with the B's, however.

Mono left the Granotes in June 2011, and subsequently joined CD Mirandés. In October he rescinded his link, and agreed a deal with UD Juventud Barrio del Cristo in Tercera División; in December, however, he moved to fellow league team Atlético Saguntino.

Mono left Saguntino in March 2012, immediately joining CD Buñol. On 3 January 2013, after a stint at UD Castellonense, he signed for CD Dénia.

Mono subsequently resumed his career in the lower leagues, representing CD Eldense, CF La Nucía, Dénia, Silla CF and UD Petrelense CF.

References

External links
Levante official profile 

1989 births
Living people
Footballers from Valencia (city)
Spanish footballers
Association football wingers
La Liga players
Segunda División B players
Tercera División players
Atlético Levante UD players
Levante UD footballers
CD Mirandés footballers
CD Eldense footballers
Atlético Saguntino players